John V, Lord of Arkel (11 September 1362 in Gorinchem – 25 August 1428 in Leerdam) was Lord of Arkel, Haastrecht and Hagestein and stadtholder of Holland, Zeeland and West Frisia.
He was a son of Lord Otto of Arkel and his wife, Elisabeth of Bar-Pierrepont.

He acquired the Lordship of Haastrecht in 1380 and Hagestein in 1382.  When he inherited Arkel from his father in 1396, he became a member of the court council of the Count of Holland.

During the reign of Albert I, the county suffered from a series of conflicts known as the Hook and Cod wars.  John V sided with Albert I and the Cods.  However, during a campaign in West Frisia, John V came into conflict with Albert's son, William VI, who sided with the Hooks.  The murder of Aleid van Poelgeest may also have played a role in their animosity.  Albert informed his father that John was no longer a faithful ally and John declared himself independent and refused to participate in further campaigns against the Frisians.  This triggered the Arkel War, in which William VI conquered Arkel.  John V lost his land and spent the years 1415-1426 in captivity.

John V died in Leerdam in 1428.  His son William inherited his claim on the Land of Arkel.

Marriage and issue 
On 18 October 1376, John married Joanna of Jülich, a daughter of Duke William II of Jülich and heiress to the Duchy of Guelders.  She died in 1394.  John and Joanna had two children:
 William (d. 1 December 1417 in Gorinchem)
 Maria (d. 1415, in IJsselstein), married John II, Count of Egmond

John had four illegitimate children:
 Otto (d. 1475, in Utrecht) married Jacobje of Arkel and had issue. 
 Henneke, (d. 1420) married John of Egmond, Lord of Wateringen
 Dirk
 Wynand, (b. 1426) goldsmith

William died when he tried to reconquer Gorinchem, which had been a possession of Arkel for many years.  He was between 30 and 34 years old and had no male heir.  The Land of Arkel was divided between Holland and Guelders.

References 
  J.W. Groesbeek:  De heren van Arkel, in: De Nederlandsche Leeuw 1954, 1954, col. 216.
  M.J. Waale: De Arkelse Oorlog, 1401-1412, Verloren, Hilversum, 1990

External links 
  Entry at genealogieonline.nl

1362 births
1428 deaths
John 05
People from Gorinchem
14th-century people of the Holy Roman Empire
15th-century people of the Holy Roman Empire